Oligostigmoides cryptalis is a moth in the family Crambidae. It was described by Herbert Druce in 1896. It is found in Mexico (Xalapa, Orizaba), Costa Rica and Panama.

References

Acentropinae
Moths described in 1896